Chris Renaud (born December 1966) is an American film producer, director, illustrator, designer, animator, and voice actor. He was nominated for an Academy Award for the 2006 animated short No Time for Nuts, which featured the character Scrat from the computer-animated Ice Age films. His most popular work is the Despicable Me franchise, including Despicable Me and Despicable Me 2, which he co-directed with Pierre Coffin. Along with Coffin, he also co-created and lent his voice to the Minions from Despicable Me.

Life and career
Chris Renaud was born in 1966 in Baltimore. At age 15, he moved to Bethlehem, Pennsylvania when his father, who worked for Bethlehem Steel, was transferred to their corporate headquarters. Renaud has said he had mixed feelings with the move, saying it upset him but it was also one of the best things in his life because it showed him "that there was a great, big world out there". He was the artist for the high school yearbooks and newspaper and had aspirations of creating comic books. He graduated Parkland High School in Allentown, Pennsylvania in 1985 and attended Baum School of Art in Allentown, where he received a $1,000 scholarship.

After graduating from Syracuse University with an illustration degree in 1989,  Renaud began work as a graphic designer in the sports entertainment industry. He has created logos and mascots for NFL Properties, the NBA, and Foot Locker. After working as a designer and illustrator for a variety of publications and agencies, Chris began drawing and writing comic books. Working for both Marvel Comics and DC Comics, his projects included illustrating Marvel's Starfleet Academy and pitching the story concept that evolved into Batman: Cataclysm which depicted a devastating earthquake hitting Gotham City. This yearlong tale across all Batman-related comics resulted in increased sales and visibility for the renowned character and set up the acclaimed "No Man's Land" storyline that followed.

As the production designer on the Disney Channel's The Book of Pooh, Renaud transitioned into the world of children's television. Since that groundbreaking project, he has been able to design virtual sets and puppet characters for Bear in the Big Blue House, LazyTown, Curious Pictures and Sony Pictures Animation. With It's a Big Big World, which aired from 2006 to 2010 on PBS, he took the lead in visual development and design of every aspect of this Emmy-nominated children's program.

Renaud worked for Blue Sky Studios as a story artist on the films Robots, Ice Age: The Meltdown, and the Dr. Seuss adaptation Horton Hears a Who!. He wrote and co-directed the animated short No Time for Nuts, which received an Annie Award and a 2007 Oscar nomination for animated short film. It was also included in the Animation Show of Shows in 2006.

Renaud moved to Paris to work for Illumination Entertainment. While directing Despicable Me (2010), Renaud, along with his directing partner Pierre Coffin, began to develop Gru's famous henchmen, the Minions. Initially, there were discussions about making the creatures robots. Then Renaud hit upon the notion that they could be mole people and slapped goggles on them. "I did a very rough, ugly, little sketch combining some elements into a mole person and sent it to Pierre, who then discussed it with Eric Guillon, who was the art director and final designer of the Minions, and they took some of those ideas and together we came up with what the Minions look like". The more the filmmakers worked on the little guys, the more yellow and more cylindrical they became. "Eric continued to refine the idea and made [the Minions] closer to children. He made them funnier and simpler and a brighter color". Among the inspirations for the Minions were the Oompa-Loompas from Willy Wonka and the Jawas from Star Wars, as well as silent screen stars Buster Keaton and Charlie Chaplin, and Warner Bros. cartoon characters.

In a four-picture directing deal, he directed Despicable Me (2010), Dr. Seuss' The Lorax (2012), Despicable Me 2 (2013), and The Secret Life of Pets (2016), in which two pet dogs, Max and Duke, have to put their quarrels behind when they find out that a bunny, Snowball, is building an army of abandoned pets to take revenge on all pet owners and their pets. Renaud signed a new contract with Illumination Entertainment in 2013, saying: "I love working with Illumination. They've given me an unparalleled opportunity to keep directing one movie after another. Very often animation directors make one movie and then spend the next five years developing another one. But I'm in the unique position of being able to keep working and keep making movies... So I feel very fortunate."

In a 2012 interview, he mentioned that he read Dr. Seuss books as a child, which influenced his work with films such as The Lorax. When asked if he would shift towards live-action movies, he said that he has thought about it and it may happen in the future but he feels comfortable with animation for now.

Renaud executive-produced Despicable Me 3 in 2017.

Personal life
Renaud has lived since 2008–2009 in Paris, France with his wife, Lauren, and their two children, John and Kiely.

Filmography

Film

Television

References

External links

DC Comics profile
Interviews
2007 interview with animatedviews.com
2012 interview with boxoffice.com

1966 births
Living people
Syracuse University alumni
Animators from Maryland
American graphic designers
Illumination (company) people
Blue Sky Studios people
American animated film directors
American storyboard artists
People from Baltimore
People from Bethlehem, Pennsylvania
Parkland High School (Pennsylvania) alumni